Ayushmann Khurrana is an Indian actor, singer, and television host who works in Hindi films. Khurrana first appeared in 2004 teen drama reality show MTV Roadies, winning the second season of the show. He went to star in many other MTV shows, including MTV Fully Faltoo Movies, Cheque De India and Jaadoo Ek Baar, and hosted multiple television shows, including India's Got Talent and Music Ka Maha Muqqabla. In 2012, he made his feature film debut with the romantic comedy Vicky Donor, about sperm donation, which received critical acclaim and performed strongly at the box office. Khurrana's performance won him the Filmfare Award for Best Male Playback Singer (for the song "Pani Da Rang"), Screen Award for Best Male Debut, Producers Guild Film Award for Best Male Debut, and Producers Guild Film Award for Best Male Playback Singer. He then starred in a series of commercially unsuccessful films, including the comedy-drama Nautanki Saala (2013), romantic comedy Bewakoofiyaan (2014), and drama Hawaizaada (2015).

In 2015, Khurrana starred in the Sharat Katariya-directed romantic drama Dum Laga Ke Haisha opposite Bhumi Pednekar. His performance was praised, and the film emerged as a commercial success. He then starred in Meri Pyaari Bindu (2017), Bareilly Ki Barfi (2017), and Shubh Mangal Saavdhan (2017). The latter two were commercially successful. In 2018, he starred in the black comedy Andhadhun and the comedy-drama Badhaai Ho. The former grossed ₹4.56 billion (US$64 million) worldwide, and became one of Indian cinema's biggest grossers; for his performance he won the National Film Award for Best Actor (shared with Vicky Kaushal for Uri: The Surgical Strike) and the Filmfare Critics Award for Best Actor. Badhaai Ho became a sleeper hit, earning over ₹2.21 billion (US$31 million) worldwide. This success continued with Khurrana's 2019 releases, Article 15, Dream Girl, and Bala. For the first of these, he won the Filmfare Critics Award for Best Actor, and Screen Award for Best Actor (Critics). In the comedy Bala, he played a man plagued with premature balding.

Film

Television

References

External links 
 

Discographies of Indian artists
Indian filmographies
Male actor filmographies